"Drum" is a song by Danish singer and songwriter MØ. It was released as a single on 7 October 2016. The song was written alongside BloodPop, Charli XCX and Noonie Bao, whilst production was handled by BloodPop. The official audio was released onto YouTube on its release date, which showed a motional, but blurred, MØ along with cameos from Noonie Bao, Charli XCX and BloodPop.

Music video
The music video for the song was released to YouTube on 17 November 2016. The accompanying was also shot and directed by Georgia Hudson, who previously directed the music video for "Don't Wanna Dance", from Ørsted's debut album No Mythologies to Follow.

Live performances
On 17 November 2016, the song was performed live for BBC Radio 1 Live.

Charts

References

2016 singles
2016 songs
MØ songs
Song recordings produced by BloodPop
Songs written by Charli XCX
Songs written by Noonie Bao
Songs written by MØ
Songs written by BloodPop
Tropical house songs